Noël Declercq (26 December 1912 – 3 May 1945) was a Belgian cyclist. He was one of the victims of the bombing of the SS Cap Arcona and SS Thielbek by the RAF in May 1945. He was one of the prisoners that were being moved from the Neuengamme concentration camp.

Major results
1937
 3rd - Paris - Roubaix
1939
 10th - Paris - Roubaix

Giro d'Italia 
1938 - 37th

References

Belgian male cyclists
1912 births
1945 deaths
People from Mouscron
Belgian civilians killed in World War II
Deaths by airstrike during World War II
Deaths due to shipwreck at sea
Neuengamme concentration camp survivors
Cyclists from Hainaut (province)